Kinga Łoboda (born 11 June 1996) is a Polish sailor. She and Aleksandra Melzacka competed for Poland at the 2020 Summer Olympics in the 49er FX event.

References

External links
 
 
 

1996 births
Living people
Polish female sailors (sport)
Olympic sailors of Poland
Sailors at the 2020 Summer Olympics – 49er FX
Sportspeople from Gdańsk